Spellbound may refer to:

Film and television 
 Spellbound (1916 film), with Lois Meredith
 Spellbound (1941 film), directed by John Harlow
 Spellbound (1945 film), directed by Alfred Hitchcock
 Spellbound (1999 film), a Japanese film directed by Masato Harada
 Spellbound (2002 film), a documentary film about the National Spelling Bee
 Spellbound (2003 film), a television film starring Richard Ruccolo
 Spellbound (2004 film), a television film starring Maggie Lawson
 Spellbound (2007 film), a television film starring Lauren Bittner
 Spellbound (2011 film), a South Korean film starring Son Ye-jin and Lee Min-ki
 Spellbound (upcoming film), an upcoming animated film directed by Vicky Jenson
 "Spellbound" (CSI), a 2006 episode of the American television series CSI: Crime Scene Investigation
 Spellbound (game show), a Sky One game show
 "Spellbound" (Lego Ninjago: Masters of Spinjitzu), a 2015 episode of Lego Ninjago: Masters of Spinjitzu

Literature 
 Spellbound (The Legend of the Ice People novel), a 2008 novel by Margit Sandemo
 Spellbound (Dale novel), a 2008 children's fantasy/magic novel by Anna Dale
 Spellbound (Green novel), a 2003 chick lit novel by Jane Green
 Spellbound, a 1988 young adult novel written by Christopher Pike
 Spellbound (Correia novel), a 2011 fantasy-noir novel written by Larry Correia
 "Candidate for a Pullet Surprise", a poem sometimes plagiarized as "Spellbound"

Music

Artists 
 The Spellbound, an electronic rock duo formed by Masayuki Nakano (formerly of Boom Boom Satellites), and Kobayashi Yusuke (of The Novembers)

Albums 
 Spellbound (Clifford Jordan album), released in 1960
 Spellbound (Ahmed Abdul-Malik album), released in 1964
 Spellbound (Tygers of Pan Tang album), released in 1981
 Spellbound (Joe Sample album), 1989 album by Joe Sample
 Spellbound (Paula Abdul album), released in 1991
 Spellbound (Split Enz album), released in 1997
 Spellbound (Ten album), released in 1999
 Spellbound, 2011 album by Jay-Jay Johanson
 Spellbound (Yngwie Malmsteen album), released 2012
 Spellbound (TVXQ album), released in 2014
 Spellbound, 2018 album by Sadist
 Spellbound, 2022 album by Judy Collins

Songs 
 "Spellbound" (Siouxsie and the Banshees song), a 1981 song from their album Juju
 "Spellbound" (Ira Losco song), a 2001 song by Ira Losco
 "Spellbound" (Lacuna Coil song), a 2009 song from their album Shallow Life
 "Spellbound", a 1975 song by Split Enz from their album Mental Notes
 "Spellbound", a 1976 song by the Bar-Kays from their album Too Hot to Stop
 "Spellbound", a 1981 song by AC/DC from their album For Those About to Rock We Salute You
 "Spellbound (by the Devil)", a 1997 song by Dimmu Borgir from their album Enthrone Darkness Triumphant
 "Spellbound", a 2010 song by Emily Williams
 "Spellbound", a 2014 song by TVXQ
 "Spellbound", a 2020 song by Lovebites from their single "Golden Destination"
 "Spellbound", a K-Solo song, subject of a dispute with DMX
 "Spellbound", a song by Bladee from Gluee

Video games 
 Spellbound (video game), a 1985 ZX Spectrum/Commodore 64 computer game starring Magic Knight
 Spellbound (1984 video game), a ZX Spectrum game, unrelated to the above
 Spellbound!, a 1993 educational computer game
 Amiga CD32, a video game console codenamed “Spellbound”

Other uses 
 SpellBound (spell checker), a spell checker for Firefox
 Spellbound Entertainment, a German computer game development company, founded by Armin Gessert in 1994
 Spellbound Pictures, a film and television production and distribution company

See also
 Spelbound, a gymnastics competition winning squad who won Britain's Got Talent in 2010